The Kent's Pacemaker was a veteran era American automobile manufactured only in 1900.

History 
Offered by the Colonial company of Boston, it was a steam car which had one wheel in front for steering, and three rear wheels.  The center of these drove; the others, an outer pair, could be raised to allow the machine to "coast like a bicycle". The vehicle was named after A. W. Kent, who was its designer.

References 

Defunct motor vehicle manufacturers of the United States
Steam cars
Veteran vehicles
1900s cars
Cars introduced in 1900
Motor vehicle manufacturers based in Massachusetts